Edmond Bernhardt (20 April 1885 – 23 May 1976) was an Austrian freestyle swimmer, sports shooter and modern pentathlete. He competed in two swimming events at the 1906 Intercalated Games. Six years later, he competed in the modern pentathlon and shooting at the 1912 Summer Olympics.

References

External links
 

1885 births
1976 deaths
Austrian male modern pentathletes
Austrian male sport shooters
Austrian male freestyle swimmers
Olympic modern pentathletes of Austria
Olympic shooters of Austria
Olympic swimmers of Austria
Modern pentathletes at the 1912 Summer Olympics
Sportspeople from Vienna
Swimmers from Vienna
Shooters at the 1912 Summer Olympics
Swimmers at the 1906 Intercalated Games
20th-century Austrian people